The Production Line was a nickname for one of the most famous scoring lines in the history of the National Hockey League (NHL). The line consisted of Gordie Howe (right wing), Sid Abel (centre) and Ted Lindsay (left wing) of the Detroit Red Wings, all members of the Hockey Hall of Fame.

In 1947, Tommy Ivan replaced Jack Adams as head coach of the Wings and instantly put the two best players on the squad (Howe and Lindsay) on either side of the future Hall of Famer Abel. Abel was in the twilight of his career but Ivan knew that he could still be a threat with two lightning fast wingers that could cover for his slowness and bring out the best in him. Howe and Lindsay were the best of friends with both having immense respect for Sid. The trio would often stay late after practice and fool around with the puck. The fooling around paid off, as the trio would perfect one of hockey's greatest plays—the set play. To take advantage of the speed of the wingers and to minimize the problems of having a slow center, the wingers would shoot the puck into the opponents' end after crossing center ice. They would angle their shoot-in so that the puck would bounce off the boards and slide to the front of the goal where the other winger could get to it. That winger would either make a quick pass to Abel in the slot or take a shot himself. It was a brilliant play for the era because goalies of the period rarely left the goal crease, and would not think to cut off the shoot-in or block the pass in front. The trio also found numerous other ways to hit the back of net off their ability to read each other and come together as a unit.

In the 1947–48 season, the trio was tops on the team in scoring and in 1949–50, when Lindsay won the scoring crown with 78 points, the three finished 1–2–3 in NHL scoring, a feat never again rivaled, and the Red Wings won the Stanley Cup. The year after, Howe won his first of four consecutive Art Ross Trophies. Howe would also finish in the top five in scoring for the next 20 seasons. When Howe retired from the NHL in 1971, he held virtually every scoring record in the NHL.

Both fans and media scrambled to come up with a catchy nickname for the threesome and soon enough, somebody coined a term that described the importance of the line to the team as well as a reference to Detroit, the car-making capital of the United States. The Production Line was born.

Production Line II
After the 1951–52 season, Sid Abel was traded to the Chicago Black Hawks to make room for another talented, albeit younger, center. Alex Delvecchio joined the team and continued to dominate the league as the center of the famed "Production Line II". Prior to Delvecchio establishing himself as a number one center, Norm Ullman and Earl Reibel took turns centering Lindsay and Howe.

Production Line III
In the late 1960s, Frank Mahovlich replaced the retired Ted Lindsay at wing for another iteration of the Production Line.

References

External links
Legends of Hockey

History of the Detroit Red Wings
Nicknamed groups of ice hockey players